Let's Hear It for Love is the eighth studio album from American singer Benny Mardones. It was released in 2006 by Warrior Records and produced by Jim Ervin.

Background
Let's Hear It for Love was Mardones' first album for Warrior Records and his first since 2002's A Journey Through Time. The album was dedicated to long-time road manager and friend, Tommy Piraino, who died around the time from leukemia. The track "Just for You My Friend" was written as a tribute to Piraino.

The title track, "Let's Hear It For Love", is a duet with Eddie Money, who also co-wrote the track. "When the Lights Go Out" is a duet with Robbyn Kirmsse, while the duet "This Time" features Katrina Carlson.

Release
The album was released on CD and as a digital download by Warrior Records. The CD was re-issued in 2007 by Warrior Records and again that year by Warrior Records and Bungalo. A single, "The Train Don't Stop Here Anymore", was released from the album.

Track listing

Critical reception

AllMusic stated: "Apart from some of the production and some wear on his voice, Let's Hear It for Love could easily be mistaken for an album Benny Mardones released in 1986 instead of one from 2006. This record is heavy on love songs, meaning that there are a lot of slow-crawling sentimental tunes that are nevertheless driven by big, cavernous drums straight out of the mid-'80s - and it also sounds like a throwback to '80s album rock. This is enjoyable stuff for anybody who has a taste for either Mardones or the softer mainstream pop of the '80s. But the singer just as often gets bogged down in treacly, turgid emoting that will please his devoted fans but will turn away those casual fans who only know (and only love) "Into the Night"."

Personnel
 Benny Mardones - vocals
 Jim Ervin/James K. Ervin - producer
 Eddie Money - vocals, saxophone (track 7)
 Katrina Carlson - vocals (track 10)
 Robbyn Kirmsse - vocals (track 8)
 Bruce Watson - guitar
 Lance Morrison - bass
 Nick Vincent - drums
 Rande Volpert - shaker, tambourine
 Bryan Davis -	bass engineer, drum engineer
 Danny Sternbaum - assistant engineer
 Brian Newman - mastering
 Rebecca Roe -	art conception, layout design
 Jon "JD" Dickson - photography

References

2006 albums
Benny Mardones albums